The Children of Times Square is a 1986 American made-for-television crime drama film directed by Curtis Hanson.

Plot
An alienated teenager runs away from home and travels to New York City where he falls in with a cocaine dealer using street children as drug dealers.

Cast
 Howard E. Rollins Jr. as Otis Talbot
 Joanna Cassidy as Sue Roberts
 David Ackroyd as Peter Roberts
 Brandon Douglas as Eric Roberts
 Larry B. Scott as Skater
 Jason Bernard as Lieutenant Devins
 Danny Nucci as Luis Sotavento
 Silvana Gallardo as Lizette Sotavento, Luis' Mother
 De'voreaux White as C.J.
 Griffin O'Neal as Rick
 Mars Callahan as Brian
 Jacob Vargas as Alberto
 Joe Spinell as Street Vendor

References

External links

1986 television films
1986 films
1986 crime drama films
1980s American films
1980s English-language films
ABC network original films
American crime drama films
American drama television films
Crime television films
Films about drugs
Films directed by Curtis Hanson
Films set in New York City